Pabellón Insular Santiago Martín is an indoor arena that is located in San Cristóbal de La Laguna, Tenerife, Spain.  It is primarily used for basketball games, and is the home arena of the Spanish professional basketball club, Iberostar Tenerife of the Liga ACB.

Structure and features
The Pabellón Insular Santiago Martín can hold 5,100 people for basketball games, and it offers 2,000 square meters of floor space. The facilities remain open all year long, without interruption.

The pavilion also provides the following facilities for athletic use: 5 large locker rooms and 4 "double" locker rooms. Additionally, a gymnasium, infirmary, video and press room are available as well as a rehab room for athletes.

History
The arena was opened in 1999. Pabellón Insular Santiago Martín is the property of the Cabildo de Tenerife (the Island Council of Tenerife), and the Ayuntamiento de La Laguna (the La Laguna City Council). Through an agreement with the Comisión de Gobierno de la Corporación Insular, the management of the pavilion was ceded to the Gestión Insular para el Deporte, la Cultura y el Ocio (the Tenerife Sport, Culture and Leisure Management, also known as IDECO).

The arena hosted the 2017 Basketball Champions League Final Four, as Iberostar Tenerife hosted the tournament. Tenerife won its first Champions League title in the Santiago Martín. The arena also hosted the 2017 FIBA Intercontinental Cup final match between Tenerife and Guaros de Lara. The arena was also used a host venue of the 2018 FIBA Women's World Cup, and the 2020 FIBA Intercontinental Cup.

References

External links
Official site 
Images of Pabellón Insular Santiago Martín 
360º Tour of Pabellón Insular Santiago Martín  
Pabellón Insular Santiago Martín 

Basketball venues in Spain
Buildings and structures in Tenerife
Indoor arenas in Spain
Sports venues in the Canary Islands